Southeast Portland is one of the sextants of Portland, Oregon.

Boundaries and features
Southeast Portland stretches from the warehouses along the Willamette River through historic Ladd's Addition to the Hawthorne and Belmont districts out to Gresham. Not far from Hawthorne is Reed College, whose campus expands from Woodstock Boulevard to Steele Street, and from 28th to 39th Avenues.

Southeast Portland also features Mt. Tabor, a cinder cone volcano that has become one of Portland's more scenic and popular parks.

Peacock Lane is a street known locally for lavish Christmas decorations and displays.

History
Southeast Portland has blue-collar roots and has evolved to encompass a wide mix of backgrounds. The Hawthorne district in particular is known for its hippie/radical crowd and small subculturally oriented shops.

Between the 1920s and the 1960s, Southeast was home to Lambert Gardens.

See also
 National Register of Historic Places listings in Southeast Portland, Oregon
 Neighborhoods of Portland, Oregon

External links